State Highway 317 (SH 317) is a  state highway in the US state of Colorado. The western terminus is at SH 13 in Hamilton, and the eastern terminus is at Routt County Route 29 (CR 29).

Route description
SH 317 runs , starting at a junction with  SH 13 in Hamilton. The highway follows the Williams Fork River to the east and ends at a junction with CR 29 just over the Routt County line.

Major intersections

References

External links

317
Transportation in Moffat County, Colorado
Transportation in Routt County, Colorado